The Neath Welsh Dragons were a short-lived speedway team who operated from Neath Abbey Stadium, Neath in 1962.

History
There were members of the Provincial League for one season and finished runners-up in the 1962 Provincial Speedway League.

The description 'stadium' is misleading because the venue was literally an oval with a cinder track with banking for spectators. The west side of the Neath Abbey was so close to the banking that the Abbey ruins looked as though they formed part of the stadium. Monastery Road at the time was situated slightly different to where it is today (it now bends to the West instead of the East). The stadium was opened to Stock car racing as early as 1954. The speedway circuit was opened by Trevor Redmond but crowds were poor and several home meetings were staged at St Austell Gulls' Cornish Stadium due to lack of floodlighting.

Season summary

References 

Defunct British speedway teams